Wang Yuanji (217 – 20 April 268) was a Chinese noble lady, aristocrat and later empress dowager of Jin dynasty, who lived during the Three Kingdoms period. She was the wife of Sima Zhao, a regent of the state of Cao Wei during the Three Kingdoms period of China. She became the empress dowager during the reign of her son Sima Yan, who ended the Wei regime and founded the Jin dynasty. She was posthumously honoured as "Empress Wenming" (literally "civil and understanding empress") after her death.

She is known for her wisdom, good moral character, contributions to the origin and stabilization of the Jin dynasty, and for predicting Zhong Hui's rebellion in 264.

Life
Wang Yuanji was from Tan County (郯縣), Donghai Commandery (東海郡), which is present-day Tancheng County, Shandong. Her father, Wang Su, served as a military officer in Wei and held a peerage as the Marquis of Lanling (蘭陵侯).

When Wang Yuanji was eight years old (by East Asian reckoning), she already had a good memory and could recite the Confucian classics fluently. Once, when she was nine, her mother Lady Yang fell sick so she remained by her mother's side all the time to take care of her. She possessed savoir faire and performed well when her parents allowed her to manage household chores. Her grandfather Wang Lang doted on her and felt that she was extraordinary. He said, 
"This girl will bring glory to our family. It's a pity that she isn't a boy!" 
These words have also been interpreted as him lamenting her headstrong, tomboyish nature during her childhood. Her grandfather's words came true, years later she contributed to the stabilization of a new dynasty and became empress.

When Wang Yuanji was 12 (by East Asian reckoning), her grandfather died and she cried her heart out. Her father respected her even more after that incident and felt that she was indeed very special.

Marriage
Wang Yuanji married Sima Zhao after reaching adulthood (around the age of 15) and bore him five sons – Sima Yan, Sima Dingguo (司馬定國), Sima You, Sima Zhao (司馬兆) and Sima Guangde (司馬廣德) – and a daughter who was historically known as Princess Jingzhao (京兆公主; literally "Princess of the Capital"). After her marriage, she maintained her good moral character and served her in-laws well. She cried her heart out again when her father died.

Due to the marriage, she was present at various events led by the Sima clan that had an impact on Cao Wei's story, such as the Incident at the Gaoping Tombs, Three Rebellions in Shouchun and Coup of Cao Mao. These events eventually led the Sima family to a higher status, until her father-in-law Sima Yi acquired control over the state of Cao Wei.

When Sima Zhao became the regent of Wei, he recognised Zhong Hui's talent and promoted the latter to higher appointments. Wang Yuanji told her husband, "Zhong Hui is a man who will forsake moral principles for his personal gains. He's likely to cause trouble if he's overly indulged and favoured. He shouldn't be entrusted with important responsibilities." Wang Yuanji's prediction came true later as Zhong Hui started a rebellion in March 264 after helping Wei conquer its rival state, Shu Han.

Empress dowager
Sima Zhao died in September 265 and was succeeded by his eldest son, Sima Yan, as the regent of Wei. In February 266, Sima Yan forced the last Wei ruler, Cao Huan, to abdicate in his favour, thereby ending the Wei regime and establishing the Jin dynasty. After ascending the throne, Sima Yan instated his mother as the empress dowager and gave her Chonghua Palace (崇化宮) as her residence. Even after becoming the empress dowager, Wang Yuanji continued to live a humble and frugal life. There were no expensive furniture and decorations in her room; she kept her meals simple, wore old clothes again after washing them, and did her own weaving. She managed the imperial harem well and maintained harmony among Sima Yan's consorts.

Wang Yuanji was admitted to the court yet sought to be simple and practical with conducting herself. However, since her followers apparently disapproved of her methods, her vassals were disorderly and instigated fights against one another. For this reason, she was said to have kept a low profile in political matters. It's not clear if the harsh charges against her were caused from her own ineptitude or due to purposeful slander from discontent retainers. 

Wang Yuanji died in 268 at the age of 52 (by East Asian age reckoning). She was buried at Chongyangling (崇陽陵; somewhere in present-day Yanshi, Luoyang, Henan) with her husband. Sima Yan personally wrote a eulogy praising his mother's moral character and ordered a court historian to have it published.

In popular culture

Wang Yuanji is first introduced as a playable character in the seventh instalment of Koei's Dynasty Warriors video game series. She has also made her appearance as a playable character in both Warriors Orochi 3 and Warriors Orochi 4，as well as in Warriors All-Stars. Her personality is portrayed as calm, cool, and collected, with a slight tendency to punish people who are lazy and out of order. Her character voice role is filled by Kanae Itō.

See also
 Lists of people of the Three Kingdoms
 Family tree of Sima Yi#Sima Zhao

Notes

References

 Fang, Xuanling (ed.) (648). Book of Jin (Jin Shu).

217 births
268 deaths
People of Cao Wei
Jin dynasty (266–420) empresses dowager
3rd-century Chinese women